Dilkusha is the commercial centre of Dhaka, the capital of Bangladesh. It is a part of the larger Motijheel area in the city. Historically, the Nawabs of Dhaka used to have a garden palace here in the 19th and early 20th century. Dilkusha was the name of that palace. The area also has a professional football club called Dilkusha SC.

References

Geography of Dhaka